Sing Tao may refer to:
 Sing Tao Daily, a newspaper published in Hong Kong and overseas
 Sing Tao Holdings, one of a predecessor of Sing Tao News Corporation
 Sing Tao News Corporation, a company in Hong Kong, has published Sing Tao Daily
 Sing Tao SC, a Hong Kong football club owned by Sing Tao Holdings, active 1940–1999
 Sing Tao Chinese Radio, the radio division of the Sing Tao News Corporation in the San Francisco Bay Area
 Sing Tao Daily (Canada), a newspaper based in Toronto

See also
 Qingdao or Tsingtao, a city in Shandong Province, China
 Tsingtao Brewery